Fissurella bravensis is a species of sea snail, a marine gastropod mollusk in the family Fissurellidae, the keyhole limpets.

Description
The length of the shell attains .

Distribution
This marine species occurs off Cape Verde.

References

 Rolán E., 2005. Malacological Fauna From The Cape Verde Archipelago. Part 1, Polyplacophora and Gastropoda.

Fissurellidae
Gastropods of Cape Verde
Gastropods described in 1967